A list of films produced in Belgium ordered by year of release. For an alphabetical list of Belgian films see :Category:Belgian films

2000

2001

2002

2003

2004

2005

2006

2007

2008

2009

External links
 Belgian film at the Internet Movie Database

2000s
2000s in Belgium
Belgium